Latent tuberculosis (LTB), also called latent tuberculosis infection (LTBI) is when a person is infected with Mycobacterium tuberculosis, but does not have active tuberculosis. Active tuberculosis can be contagious while latent tuberculosis is not, and it is therefore not possible to get TB from someone with latent tuberculosis. The main risk is that approximately 10% of these people (5% in the first two years after infection and 0.1% per year thereafter) will go on to develop active tuberculosis. This is particularly true, and there is added risk, in particular situations such as medication that suppresses the immune system or advancing age.

The identification and treatment of people with latent TB is an important part of controlling this disease. Various treatment regimens are in use for latent tuberculosis. They generally need to be taken for several months.

Transmission

Latent disease
TB Bacteria Are Spread Only from a Person with Active TB Disease ... In people who develop active TB of the lungs, also called pulmonary TB, the TB skin test will often be positive. In addition, they will show all the signs and symptoms of TB disease, and can pass the bacteria to others. So, if a person with TB of the lungs sneezes, coughs, talks, sings, or does anything that forces the bacteria into the air, other people nearby may breathe in TB bacteria. Statistics show that approximately one-third of people exposed to pulmonary TB become infected with the bacteria, but only one in ten of these infected people develops active TB disease during their lifetimes.However, exposure to tuberculosis is very unlikely to happen when one is exposed for a few minutes in a store or in a few minutes social contact. "It usually takes prolonged exposure to someone with active TB disease for someone to become infected.

After exposure, it usually takes 8 to 10 weeks before the TB test would show if someone had become infected."Depending on ventilation and other factors, these tiny droplets [from the person who has active tuberculosis] can remain suspended in the air for several hours. Should another person inhale them, he or she may become infected with TB. The probability of transmission will be related to the infectiousness of the person with TB, the environment where the exposure occurred, the duration of the exposure, and the susceptibility of the host.In fact, "it isn't easy to catch TB. You need consistent exposure to the contagious person for a long time. For that reason, you're more likely to catch TB from a relative than a stranger."

If a person had latent tuberculosis, they do not have active/contagious tuberculosis. Once exposed, people very often have latent tuberculosis. To convert to active tuberculosis, the bacteria must become active.

In some Countries like Canada people have medical privacy or "confidentiality" and do not have to reveal their active tuberculosis case to family, friends, or co-workers; therefore, the person who gets latent tuberculosis may never know who had the active case of tuberculosis that caused the latent tuberculosis diagnosis for them. Only by required testing (required in some jobs) or developing symptoms of active tuberculosis and visiting a medical doctor who does testing will a person know they have been exposed. Because tuberculosis is not common in the United States, doctors may not suspect tuberculosis; therefore, they may not test. If a person has symptoms of tuberculosis, it is wise to be tested.

Persons with diabetes may have an 18% chance of converting to active tuberculosis. In fact, death from tuberculosis was greater in diabetic patients. Persons with HIV and latent tuberculosis have a 10% chance of developing active tuberculosis every year. "HIV infection is the greatest known risk factor for the progression of latent M. tuberculosis infection to active TB. In many African countries, 30–60% of all new TB cases occur in people with HIV, and TB is the leading cause of death globally for HIV-infected people."

Reactivation
Once a person has been diagnosed with Latent Tuberculosis (LTBI) and a medical doctor confirms no active tuberculosis, the person should remain alert to symptoms of active tuberculosis for the remainder of their life. Even after completing the full course of medication, there is no guarantee that the tuberculosis bacteria have all been killed."When a person develops active TB (disease), the symptoms (cough, fever, night sweats, weight loss etc.) may be mild for many months. This can lead to delays in seeking care, and results in transmission of the bacteria to others."

Tuberculosis does not always settle in the lungs. If the outbreak of tuberculosis is in the brain, organs, kidneys, joints, or others areas, the patient may have active tuberculosis for an extended period of time before discovering that they are active. "A person with TB disease may feel perfectly healthy or may only have a cough from time to time." However, these symptoms do not guarantee tuberculosis, and they may not exist at all, yet the patient may still have active tuberculosis. A person with symptoms listed may have active tuberculosis, and the person should immediately see a physician so that tuberculosis is not spread. If a person with the above symptoms does not see a physician, ignoring the symptoms can result in lung damage, eye damage, organ damage and eventually death.

When tuberculosis settles in other organs (rather than lungs) or other parts of the body (such as the skeletal), symptoms may be different from when it settles in the lungs (such as the symptoms listed above). Thus, without the cough or flu-like symptoms, a person can unwittingly have active tuberculosis. Other symptoms include back pain, flank pain, PID symptoms, confusion, coma, difficulty swallowing, and many other symptoms that would be a part of other diseases. (Please see the reference for more information on symptoms.) Therefore, seeing a physician and asking for a tuberculosis test is absolutely necessary to rule out tuberculosis when a patient has symptoms without a diagnosis of disease.

Risk factors 
Situations in which tuberculosis may become reactivated are:
 if there is onset of a disease affecting the immune system (such as AIDS) or a disease whose treatment affects the immune system (such as chemotherapy in cancer or systemic steroids in asthma or Enbrel, Humira or Orencia in rheumatoid arthritis);
 malnutrition (which may be the result of illness or injury affecting the digestive system, or of a prolonged period of not eating, or disturbance in food availability such as famine, residence in refugee camp or concentration camp, or civil war);
 degradation of the immune system due to aging.
 certain systemic diseases such as diabetes, and "other conditions: debilitating disease (especially haematological and some solid cancers), long-term steroids, end-stage renal disease, silicosis and gastrectomy/jejuno-ileal bypass all confer an increased risk.
 "Elderly patients: latent TB may reactivate in elderly patients."
 young age.

Diagnosis
There are two classes of tests commonly used to identify patients with latent tuberculosis: tuberculin skin tests and IFN-γ (Interferon-gamma) tests.

The skin tests currently include the following two:

 Mantoux test
 Heaf test

IFN-γ tests include the following three:
 T-SPOT.TB
 QuantiFERON-TB Gold
 QuantiFERON-TB Gold In-Tube

Tuberculin skin testing
The tuberculin skin test (TST) in its first iteration, the Mantoux Test, was developed in 1908. Tuberculin (also called purified protein derivative or PPD) is a standardised dead extract of cultured TB, injected into the skin to measure the person's immune response to the bacteria. So, if a person has been exposed to the bacteria previously, they should express an immune reaction to the injection, usually a mild swelling or redness around the site. There have been two primary methods of TST: the Mantoux test, and the Heaf test. The Heaf test was discontinued in 2005 because the manufacturer deemed its production to be financially unsustainable, though it was previously preferred in the UK because it was felt to require less training to administer and involved less inter-observer variation in its interpretation than the Mantoux test. The Mantoux test was the preferred test in the US, and is now the most widely used TST globally.

Mantoux test
See: Mantoux test
The Mantoux test is now standardised by the WHO. 0.1 ml of tuberculin (100 units/ml), which delivers a dose of 5 units is given by intradermal injection into the surface of the lower forearm (subcutaneous injection results in false negatives). A waterproof ink mark is drawn around the injection site so as to avoid difficulty finding it later if the level of reaction is small. The test is read 48 to 72 hours later. The area of induration (NOT of erythema) is measured transversely across the forearm (left to right, not up and down) and recorded to the nearest millimetre.

Heaf test
See:Heaf test

The Heaf test was first described in 1951. The test uses a Heaf gun with disposable single-use heads; each head has six needles arranged in a circle. There are standard heads and pediatric heads: the standard head is used on all patients aged 2 years and older; the pediatric head is for infants under the age of 2. For the standard head, the needles protrude 2 mm when the gun is actuated; for the pediatric heads, the needles protrude 1 mm. Skin is cleaned with alcohol, then tuberculin (100,000 units/ml) is evenly smeared on the skin (about 0.1 ml); the gun is then applied to the skin and fired. The excess solution is then wiped off and a waterproof ink mark is drawn around the injection site. The test is read 2 to 7 days later.
 Grade 0: no reaction, or induration of 3 or less puncture points;
 Grade 1: induration of four or more puncture points;
 Grade 2: induration of the six puncture points coalesce to form a circle;
 Grade 3: induration of 5 mm; or more
 Grade 4: induration of 10 mm or more, or ulceration

The results of both tests are roughly equivalent as follows:
 Heaf grade 0 & 1 ~ Mantoux less than 5 mm;
 Heaf grade 2 ~ Mantoux 5–14 mm;
 Heaf grade 3 & 4 ~ Mantoux 15 or greater

Tuberculin conversion
Tuberculin conversion is said to occur if a patient who has previously had a negative tuberculin skin test develops a positive tuberculin skin test at a later test. It indicates a change from negative to positive, and usually signifies a new infection.

Boosting
The phenomenon of boosting is one way of obtaining a false positive test result. Theoretically, a person's ability to develop a reaction to the TST may decrease over time – for example, a person is infected with latent TB as a child, and is administered a TST as an adult. Because there has been such a long time since the immune responses to TB has been necessary, that person might give a negative test result. If so, there is a fairly reasonable chance that the TST triggers a hypersensitivity in the person's immune system – in other words, the TST reminds the person's immune system about TB, and the body overreacts to what it perceives as a reinfection. In this case, when that subject is given the test again (as is standard procedure, see above) they may have a significantly greater reaction to the test, giving a very strong positive; this can be commonly misdiagnosed as Tuberculin Conversion. This can also be triggered by receiving the BCG vaccine, as opposed to a proper infection. Although boosting can occur in any age group, the likelihood of the reaction increases with age.

Boosting is only likely to be relevant if an individual is beginning to undergo periodic TSTs (health care workers, for example). In this case the standard procedure is called two-step testing. The individual is given their first test and in the event of a negative, given a second test in 1 to 3 weeks. This is done to combat boosting in situations where, had that person waited up to a year to get their next TST, they might still have a boosted reaction, and be misdiagnosed as a new infection.

Here there is a difference in US and UK guidelines; in the US testers are told to ignore the possibility of false positive due to the BCG vaccine, as the BCG is seen as having waning efficacy over time. Therefore, the CDC urges that individuals be treated based on risk stratification regardless of BCG vaccination history, and if an individual receives a negative and then a positive TST they will be assessed for full TB treatment beginning with X-ray to confirm TB is not active and proceeding from there. Conversely, the UK guidelines acknowledge the potential effect of the BCG vaccination, as it is mandatory and therefore a prevalent concern – though the UK shares the procedure of administering two tests, one week apart, and accepting the second one as the accurate result, they also assume that a second positive is indicative of an old infection (and therefore certainly LTBI) or the BCG itself. In the case of BCG vaccinations confusing the results, Interferon-γ (IFN-γ) tests may be used as they will not be affected by the BCG.

Interpretation
According to the U.S. guidelines, there are multiple size thresholds for declaring a positive result of latent tuberculosis from the Mantoux test: For testees from high-risk groups, such as those who are HIV positive, the cutoff is 5 mm of induration; for medium risk groups, 10 mm; for low-risk groups, 15 mm. The U.S. guidelines recommend that a history of previous BCG vaccination should be ignored. For details of tuberculin skin test interpretation, please refer to the CDC guidelines (reference given below).

The UK guidelines are formulated according to the Heaf test: In patients who have had BCG previously, latent TB is diagnosed if the Heaf test is grade 3 or 4 and have no signs or symptoms of active TB; if the Heaf test is grade 0 or 1, then the test is repeated. In patients who have not had BCG previously, latent TB is diagnosed if the Heaf test is grade 2, 3 or 4, and have no signs or symptoms of active TB. Repeat Heaf testing is not done in patients who have had BCG (because of the phenomenon of boosting). For details of tuberculin skin test interpretation, please refer to the BTS guidelines (references given below).

Given that the US recommendation is that prior BCG vaccination be ignored in the interpretation of tuberculin skin tests, false positives with the Mantoux test are possible as a result of: (1) having previously had a BCG (even many years ago), or (2) periodical testing with tuberculin skin tests. Having regular TSTs boosts the immunological response in those people who have previously had BCG, so these people will falsely appear to be tuberculin conversions. This may lead to treating more people than necessary, with the possible risk of those patients developing adverse drug reactions. However, as Bacille Calmette-Guérin vaccine is not 100% effective, and is less protective in adults than pediatric patients, not treating these patients could lead to a possible infection. The current US policy seems to reflect a desire to err on the side of safety.

The U.S. guidelines also allow for tuberculin skin testing in immunosuppressed patients (those with HIV, or who are on immunosuppressive drugs), whereas the UK guidelines recommend that tuberculin skin tests should not be used for such patients because it is unreliable.

Interferon-γ testing
The role of IFN-γ tests is undergoing constant review and various guidelines have been published with the option for revision as new data becomes available.CDC:MMWR Health Protection Agency:UK

There are currently two commercially available interferon-γ release assays (IGRAs): QuantiFERON-TB Gold and T-SPOT.TB. These tests are not affected by prior BCG vaccination, and look for the body's response to specific TB antigens not present in other forms of mycobacteria and BCG (ESAT-6). Whilst these tests are new they are now becoming available globally.

CDC:

HPA Interim Guidance:

Drug-resistant strains
It is usually assumed by most medical practitioners in the early stages of a diagnosis that a case of latent tuberculosis is the normal or regular strain of tuberculosis. It will therefore be most commonly treated with Isoniazid (the most used treatment for latent tuberculosis.) Only if the tuberculosis bacteria does not respond to the treatment will the medical practitioner begin to consider more virulent strains, requiring significantly longer and more thorough treatment regimens.

There are 4 types of tuberculosis recognized in the world today:
 Tuberculosis (TB)
 Multi-drug-resistant tuberculosis (MDR TB)
 Extensively drug-resistant tuberculosis (XDR TB)
 Totally drug-resistant tuberculosis (TDR TB)

Treatment

The treatment of latent tuberculosis infection (LTBI) is essential to controlling and eliminating TB by reducing the risk that TB infection will progress to disease. Latent tuberculosis will convert to active tuberculosis in 10% of cases (or more in cases of immune compromised patients). Taking medication for latent tuberculosis is recommended by many doctors.

In the U.S., the standard treatment is nine months of isoniazid, but this regimen is not widely used outside of the US.

Terminology
There is no agreement regarding terminology: the terms preventive therapy and chemoprophylaxis have been used for decades, and are preferred in the UK because it involves giving medication to people who have no disease and are currently well: the reason for giving medication is primarily to prevent people from becoming unwell. In the U.S., physicians talk about latent tuberculosis treatment because the medication does not actually prevent infection: the person is already infected and the medication is intended to prevent existing silent infection from becoming active disease. There are no convincing reasons to prefer one term over the other.

Specific situations

"Populations at increased risk of progressing to active infection once exposed:
 Persons with recent TB infection [those infected within the previous two years]
 Congenital or acquired immunosuppressed patients (in particular, HIV-positive patients)
 Illicit intravenous drug users; alcohol and other chronic substance users
 Children (particularly those younger than 4 years old)
 Persons with comorbid conditions (ie, chronic kidney failure, diabetes, malignancy, hematologic cancers, body weight of at least 10% less than ideal, silicosis, gastrectomy, jejunoileal bypass, asthma, or other disorders requiring long-term use of corticosteroids or other immunosuppressants)."

Treatment regimens
It is essential that assessment to rule out active TB be carried out before treatment for LTBI is started. To give treatment for latent tuberculosis to someone with active tuberculosis is a serious error: the tuberculosis will not be adequately treated and there is a serious risk of developing drug-resistant strains of TB.

There are several treatment regimens currently in use:
 9H — isoniazid for 9 months is the gold standard (93% effective, in patients with positive test results and fibrotic pulmonary lesions compatible with tuberculosis).
 6H — Isoniazid for 6 months might be adopted by a local TB program based on cost-effectiveness and patient compliance. This is the regimen currently recommended in the UK for routine use. The U.S. guidance excludes this regimen from use in children or persons with radiographic evidence of prior tuberculosis (old fibrotic lesions) (69% effective).
 6 to 9H2 — An intermittent twice-weekly regimen for the above two treatment regimens is an alternative if administered under Directly observed therapy (DOT).
 4R — rifampicin for 4 months is an alternative for those who are unable to take isoniazid or who have had known exposure to isoniazid-resistant TB.
 3HR — Isoniazid and rifampin may be given daily for three months.
 2RZ — The two-month regimen of rifampin and pyrazinamide is no longer recommended for treatment of LTBI because of the greatly increased risk of drug-induced hepatitis and death.
 3HP – three-month (12-dose) regimen of weekly rifapentine and isoniazid. The 3HP regimen has to be administered under DOT. A self-administered therapy (SAT) of 3HP is investigated in a large international study.

Evidence for treatment effectiveness
A 2000 Cochrane review containing 11 double-blinded, randomized control trials and 73,375 patients examined six and 12 month courses of isoniazid (INH) for treatment of latent tuberculosis. HIV positive and patients currently or previously treated for tuberculosis were excluded. The main result was a relative risk (RR) of 0.40 (95% confidence interval (CI) 0.31 to 0.52) for development of active tuberculosis over two years or longer for patients treated with INH, with no significant difference between treatment courses of six or 12 months (RR 0.44, 95% CI 0.27 to 0.73 for six months, and 0.38, 95% CI 0.28 to 0.50 for 12 months).

A Cochrane systematic review published in 2013 evaluated four different alternatives regimens to INH monotherapy for preventing active TB in HIV-negative people with latent tuberculosis infection. The evidence from this review found no difference between shorter regimens of Rifampicin or weekly, directly observed Rifapentine plus INH compare to INH monotherapy in preventing active TB in HIV-negative people at risk of developing it . However the review found that the shorter Rifampicin regimen for four months and weekly directly observed Rifapentine plus INH for three months "may have additional advantages of higher treatment completion and improved safety." However the overall quality of evidence was low to moderate (as per GRADE criteria )and none of the included trials were conducted in LMIC nations with high TB transmission and hence might not be applicable to nations with high TB transmission.

Treatment efficacy
There is no guaranteed "cure" for latent tuberculosis. "People infected with TB bacteria have a lifetime risk of falling ill with TB..." with those who have compromised immune systems, those with diabetes and those who use tobacco at greater risk.

A person who has taken the complete course of Isoniazid (or other full course prescription for tuberculosis) on a regular, timely schedule may have been cured. "Current standard therapy is isoniazid (INH) which reduce the risk of active TB by as much as 90 per cent (in patients with positive LTBI test results and fibrotic pulmonary lesions compatible with tuberculosis) if taken daily for 9 months." However, if a person has not completed the medication exactly as prescribed, the "cure" is less likely, and the "cure" rate is directly proportional to following the prescribed treatment specifically as recommended. Furthermore, "[I]f you don't take the medicine correctly and you become sick with TB a second time, the TB may be harder to treat if it has become drug resistant." If a patient were to be cured in the strictest definition of the word, it would mean that every single bacterium in the system is removed or dead, and that person cannot get tuberculosis (unless re-infected). However, there is no test to assure that every single bacterium has been killed in a patient's system. As such, a person diagnosed with latent TB can safely assume that, even after treatment, they will carry the bacteria – likely for the rest of their lives. Furthermore, "It has been estimated that up to one-third of the world's population is infected with M. tuberculosis, and this population is an important reservoir for disease reactivation." This means that in areas where TB is endemic treatment may be even less certain to "cure" TB, as reinfection could trigger activation of latent TB already present even in cases where treatment was followed completely.

Epidemiology
Tuberculosis exists in all countries in the world, though some countries have a larger number of people infected than others. Per 100,000 people, Eswatini has the greatest number of tuberculosis cases in the world (627). Second is Cambodia (560), followed by Zambia (445), fourth is Djibouti (382), fifth is Indonesia (321), Mali (295), Zimbabwe (291), Kenya (291), Papua New Guinea (283) and Gambia (283).

The United States, Sweden and Iceland have some of the lowest rates of tuberculosis at 2 per 100,000. Canada, Netherlands, Jamaica, Norway, Malta, Grenada and Antigua and Barbuda also have low infection rates, at 3 per 100,000. In North America, countries over 10:100,000 include Mexico (14), Belize (18), Bahamas (19), Panama (28), El Salvador (36), Nicaragua (35), Honduras (46), Guatemala (48), and the Dominican Republic (88).

Most Western European countries have less than 10 per 100,000 except Spain (14), Portugal (16), Estonia (27), Latvia (43) and Lithuania (48), while Eastern and Southern European countries tend to have a greater number, with Romania (94) being the highest.

In South America, the countries with the greatest rates of tuberculosis per 100,000 are Bolivia (30) and Guyana (18), with the remaining countries having less than 10:100,000.

"One-third of the world's burden of tuberculosis (TB), or about 4.9 million prevalent cases, is found in the World Health Organization (WHO) South-East Asia Region."

"About one-third of the world's population has latent TB, which means people have been infected by TB bacteria but are not (yet) ill with disease and cannot transmit the disease," and most of those cases are in developing countries.

"In the US, over half of all active TB cases occur in immigrants. The reported cases of active TB in foreign-born persons has remained at 7000–8000 per year, while the number of cases in US-born people has dropped from 17,000 in 1993 to 6,500 in 2005. As a result, the percentage of active TB cases in immigrants has increased steadily (from 29% of all cases in 1993 to 54% in 2005)," and most of those cases are in developing countries.

Controversy

There is controversy over whether people who test positive long after infection have a significant risk of developing the disease (without re-infection).  Some researchers and public health officials have warned that this test-positive population is a "source of future TB cases" even in the US and other wealthy countries, and that this "ticking time bomb" should be a focus of attention and resources.

On the other hand, Marcel Behr, Paul Edelstein, and Lalita Ramakrishnan reviewed studies concerning the concept of latent tuberculosis in order to determine whether tuberculosis-infected persons have life-long infection capable of causing disease at any future time. These studies, both published in the British Medical Journal (BMJ) in 2018 and 2019, show that the incubation period of tuberculosis is short, usually within months after infection, and very rarely more than two years after infection. They also show that more than 90% of people infected with M. tuberculosis for more than two years never develop tuberculosis even if their immune system is severely suppressed. Immunologic tests for tuberculosis infection such as the tuberculin skin test and interferon gamma release assays (IGRA) only indicate past infection, with the majority of previously infected persons no longer capable of developing tuberculosis. Ramakrishnan told the New York Times that researchers "have spent hundreds of millions of dollars chasing after latency, but the whole idea that a quarter of the world is infected with TB is based on a fundamental misunderstanding." The first BMJ article about latency was accompanied by an editorial written by Dr. Soumya Swaminathan, Deputy Director-General of the World Health Organization, who endorsed the findings and called for more funding of TB research directed at the most heavily afflicted parts of the world, rather than disproportionate attention to a relatively minor problem that affects just the wealthy countries.

The World Health Organization no longer endorses the concept that all those with immunologic evidence of past TB infection are currently infected and so are at risk of developing TB some time in the future. In 2022, the WHO issued corrigenda to its 2021 Global TB Report to clarify estimates on the worldwide burden of infected people.  These corrigenda deleted "About a quarter of the world's population is infected with M. tuberculosis" and replaced it with "About a quarter of the world's population has been infected with M. tuberculosis." The corrigenda also removed the prior estimate of the lifetime risk of TB of 5 to 10% among those with evidence of past TB infection, indicating that they no longer have confidence in earlier estimates that a substantial percentage of those with positive immunologic test results will develop the disease.

See also
 Silent disease

References

Further reading

External links 

Immunologic tests
tuberculosis
Tuberculosis